"Not Too Much to Ask" is a song recorded by American country music artists Mary Chapin Carpenter and Joe Diffie.  It was released in September 1992 as the second single from Carpenter's album Come On Come On.  The song reached number 15 on the Billboard Hot Country Singles & Tracks chart in December 1992. It was nominated for a 1993 Grammy Award for Best Country Collaboration with Vocals.  It was written by Carpenter and Don Schlitz.

Critical reception
David Browne of Entertainment Weekly gave the song a negative review, calling it "a delicate acoustic ballad that doesn't set off as many sparks as the collaboration promises."

Chart performance

References

1992 singles
Mary Chapin Carpenter songs
Joe Diffie songs
Male–female vocal duets
Songs written by Mary Chapin Carpenter
Songs written by Don Schlitz
Columbia Records singles
1992 songs